The Farmer and the Viper is one of Aesop's Fables, numbered 176 in the Perry Index. It has the moral that kindness to evil will be met by betrayal and is the source of the idiom "to nourish a viper in one's bosom". The fable is not to be confused with The Snake and the Farmer, which looks back to a situation when friendship was possible between the two.

The story
The story concerns a farmer who finds a viper freezing in the snow. Taking pity on it, he picks it up and places it within his coat. The viper, revived by the warmth, bites his rescuer, who dies realizing that it is his own fault. The story is recorded in both Greek and Latin sources. In the former, the farmer dies reproaching himself "for pitying a scoundrel", while in the version by Phaedrus the snake says that he bit his benefactor "to teach the lesson not to expect a reward from the wicked." The latter sentiment is made the moral in Medieval versions of the fable. Odo of Cheriton's snake answers the farmer's demand for an explanation with a counter-question, "Did you not know that there is enmity and natural antipathy between your kind and mine? Did you not know that a serpent in the bosom, a mouse in a bag and fire in a barn give their hosts an ill reward?" In modern times the fable has been applied in the religious sphere to teach that if one participates in unrighteous activities one is not immune to harm.

Aesop's fable was so widespread in Classical times that allusions to it became proverbial. One of the very earliest is in a poem by the 6th century BCE Greek poet Theognis of Megara, who refers to a friend who has betrayed him as the 'chill and wily snake that I cherished in my bosom'. In the work of Cicero it appears as In sinu viperam habere (to have a snake in the breast) and in Erasmus' 16th century collection of proverbial phrases, the Adagia, as Colubrum in sinu fovere (to nourish a serpent in one's bosom). The usual English form is 'to nourish a snake (or viper) in one's bosom', a phrase used by Geoffrey Chaucer (Merchant's Tale, line 1786), William Shakespeare (Richard II 3.2.129–31,) John Milton (Samson Agonistes, line 763) and John Dryden (All for Love 4.1.464–66), among the foremost.

Variations on a theme

In one of the fable's alternative versions, the farmer takes the snake home to revive it and is bitten there. Eustache Deschamps told it this way in a moral ballade dating from the end of the 14th century in which the repeated refrain is "Evil for good is often the return." William Caxton amplified this version by having the snake threaten the farmer's wife and then strangle the farmer when he tried to intervene. In still another variation, the farmer kills the snake with an axe when it threatens his wife and children. La Fontaine tells it thus as "Le villageois et le serpent" (VI.13).

The Russian fabulist Ivan Krylov, who often used La Fontaine's fables for a variation of his own, adapted the story to address contemporary circumstances in his "The Peasant & The Snake".  Written at a time when many Russian families were employing French prisoners from Napoleon I's invasion of 1812 to educate their children, he expressed his distrust of the defeated enemy. In his fable the snake seeks sanctuary in a peasant home and pleads to be taken in as a servant. The peasant replies that he cannot take the risk of endangering his family and kills the snake.

In Nathaniel Hawthorne's short story "Egotism or The Bosom-Serpent" (1843), the proverbial phrase as used in Milton's Samson Agonistes was given a new psychological twist. Sampson was alluding to cherishing the proverbial 'snake in the bosom', in this case the woman who had betrayed him. In Hawthorne's story a husband separated from his wife, but still dwelling upon her, becomes inturned and mentally unstable. The obsession that is killing him (and may even have taken physical form) vanishes once the couple are reconciled.

Khushwant Singh's short story "The Mark of Vishnu" (1950) adapts the situation of the fable to an Eastern background. A Brahmin priest, assured in the belief that a cobra has a godly nature and will never harm others if treated courteously, is nevertheless killed by the snake when trying to heal and feed it.

Oscar Brown Jr. adapted the fable as a song called The Snake, released in 1963 and recorded in several versions in the 1960s and 1970s.

See also
 The Scorpion and the Frog

References

External links
15th-20th century illustrations of "The countryman and the snake" from books

Aesop's Fables
La Fontaine's Fables
Proverbs
Fictional farmers
Fictional snakes
Metaphors referring to snakes